The 1986–87 Gamma Ethniki was the fourth season since the official establishment of the third tier of Greek football in 1983. Chalkida and Edessaikos were crowned champions in Southern and Northern Group respectively, thus winning promotion to Beta Ethniki. Kallithea and Naoussa also won promotion as a runners-up of the groups.

Fostiras, Patras, Thiva, Peramaikos, Thriamvos, Vyzas, Paniliakos, Anagennisi Giannitsa, Pyrsos Grevena, Achilleas Farsala, Panthrakikos, Langadas and Megas Alexandros Alexandria were relegated to Delta Ethniki.

Southern Group

League table

Northern Group

League table

References

Third level Greek football league seasons
3
Greece